Second cabinet of Omar Karami (26 October 2004 to 19 April 2005) is the 67th cabinet formation in Lebanon led by Prime Minister Omar Karami. The cabinet came after extending the presidency of Émile Lahoud for three years. The cabinet fell after large demonstrations following the assassination of former Prime Minister Rafik Hariri.

The cabinet members were as follows:

Composition

See also
 List of Cabinets of Lebanon

References

2004 establishments in Lebanon
2005 disestablishments in Lebanon
Cabinets of Lebanon
Cabinets established in 2004
Cabinets disestablished in 2005